Zangolabad (also Romanized as Zangolābād and Zangalabad; also known as Rangolābād) is a village in Mojezat Rural District, in the Central District of Zanjan County, Zanjan Province, Iran. At the 2006 census, its population was 200, in 50 families.

References 

Populated places in Zanjan County